Luan Peters (11 June 1946 – 24 December 2017), also known as Karol Keyes, was an English actress and singer.

Biography
Born Carol Ann Hirsch, she made her stage debut in a pantomime aged four, then went on to win a drama scholarship at the age of 16 after a performance of Twelfth Night.

She started singing in a band for £2 a night as a way of earning extra money while attending drama school. In Manchester, under the name Karol Keyes (named after her management, Keystone Promotions), she fronted Karol Keyes and the Big Sound, a band previously known as The Fat Sound. One of her first records was an Ike & Tina Turner song called "A Fool in Love", released on Columbia. She left that band in June 1966; subsequently, as Luan Peters (a name she adopted in the late 1960s), she succeeded Tina Charles as frontwoman of 5000 Volts. A year later, she joined Joan Littlewood’s drama school at the Theatre Royal Stratford East. In 1971, she starred in Not Tonight, Darling a drama directed by Anthony Sloman.

Peters is known for her appearances in Hammer horror films of the 1970s such as Lust for a Vampire (1971) and Twins of Evil (1971). Other film credits include Man of Violence (1969), Freelance (1971), Not Tonight, Darling (1971), The Flesh and Blood Show (1972), Vampira (1974), Land of the Minotaur (1976), The Wildcats of St Trinian's (1980) and Pacific Banana (1981).

Her stage work includes A Man Most Likely To (1969, with George Cole), Pyjama Tops (1969), Decameron 73 (1973), John, Paul, George, Ringo ... and Bert (1974, playing Linda McCartney), Tom Stoppard's Dirty Linen (1976), Shut Your Eyes And Think Of England! (1978) and Funny Peculiar (1985).

In 1972, she starred in the unbroadcast television series Go Girl, as a go-go dancer caught up in thriller situations. The pilot episode, possibly the only one made, was released twice on UK video in the early 1980s, first as Give Me a Ring Sometime (the pilot episode title) and later as Passport to Murder.
Other series were: Z-Cars, Dear Mother...Love Albert, Public Eye, Coronation Street (playing series regular Lorna Shawcross in 1971), Doctor Who (in the serials The Macra Terror in 1967, and Frontier in Space in 1973), Target, The Professionals, and the Fawlty Towers episode "The Psychiatrist" in which she played Raylene Miles, an Australian tourist. Her last known television role was in an episode of The Bill in 1990. In 2005, she was interviewed for the documentary Fawlty Towers Revisited.

Death 
Luan Peters died on Christmas Eve 2017, aged 71, but her death was not made public until June 2018.

Discography

Singles
 "The Good Love The Bad Love" "Gonna Find me a Substitute" (Karol Keyes & the Big Sound, Unreleased Abbey Rd. EMI audition Recording)
"No One Can Take Your Place"/"You Beat Me To The Punch" (Fontana TF517 December 1964) (as Karol Keyes)
"One in a Million" (1964) (as Karol Keyes)
"A Fool in Love/The Good Love and the Bad Love" (1966) (as Karol Keyes)
"Don't Jump" (1966) (as Karol Keyes)
"Can't You Hear the Music"/"The Sweetest Touch" (Fontana TF 846 July 1967) (as Karol Keyes)
"Crazy Annie/ Colours" (1970)
"Everything I Want to Do/Billy Come Down" (1973, Polydor)
"Love Countdown/Beach Love" (1977, CBS, Germany)
"Dolphin Dive" (1979)
"It's Me Again Margaret/Henhouse Holiday" (1980, Precision)
"Trouble" (1981, from the film Pacific Banana)

References

External links
 
 Karol Keyes discography at Discogs
 

1946 births
2017 deaths
English women singers
English film actresses
English television actresses
People from Bethnal Green